A. Jayamohan was an Indian politician and former Member of Parliament elected from Tamil Nadu. He was elected to the Lok Sabha from Tiruppattur constituency as an Indian National Congress candidate in 1984, 1989 and 1991 elections.

He died near Ambur on the Chennai-Bangalore highway, in a road mishap on 25 April 2010.

References 

Indian National Congress politicians from Tamil Nadu
2010 deaths
Year of birth missing
India MPs 1984–1989
India MPs 1989–1991
India MPs 1991–1996
Lok Sabha members from Tamil Nadu
People from Vellore district